Death Tunnel is a 2005 horror movie filmed at the Waverly Hills Sanatorium. It stars Steffany Huckaby, Annie Burgstede, Kristin Novak, and Jason Lasater.

Plot
For an initiation stunt, five college women are locked in an abandoned Kentucky hospital.

Cast
 Steffany Huckaby – Heather
 Melanie Lewis – Devon
 Yolanda Pecoraro – Elizabeth
 Kristin Novak – Ashley
 Annie Burgstede – Tori
 Jason Lasater – Richie
 Gary Wolf – Gio 
 Robyn Corum – Leah
 Gill Gayle – Professor
 Brian Dyer – Dr. Vanguard
 Reenie Varga – Spinal Nurse
 Jilon Ghai – Mason
 Jesse Bernstein – Cameron 
 George W. Harr Jr. – Death in Sanatorium
 B.J. Winslow – Death in Morgue
 Joan Farrell – Traci

References

External links
 
 

2005 films
2005 horror films
American haunted house films
American ghost films
2000s English-language films
2000s American films